The dusky lory (Pseudeos fuscata) is a species of parrot in the family Psittaculidae. Alternative common names are the white-rumped lory or the dusky-orange lory. It is found in New Guinea and the offshore islands of Batanta, Salawati and  Yapen. They are also known as "banded lories" or "duskies".

Description
The dusky lory is short-tailed parrot about 25 cm (10 in) long. It is mainly brown and has a whitish back and rump. It has two colour phases; the band across the upper chest together with its abdomen are either yellow or orange. The beak is dark orange and there is an area of bare orange skin at the base of its lower mandible. The irises are red and the legs are grey. The male and females are identical in external appearance. Juveniles are duller with a yellowish back and rump, yellowish-grey irises, and a beak that is yellow at the base and brown/black towards the tip.

Range and habitat
The dusky lory's native range includes New Guinea below about 2500m in both the Indonesian (West Papua), and Papua New Guinean zones of the island. It is also native to the nearby Indonesian islands of Salawati and Yapen.

Its natural habitats are subtropical or tropical moist lowland forest, subtropical or tropical mangrove forests, and subtropical or tropical moist montane forest.

Photographs showing plumage colours

References

Cited texts

External links

dusky lory
dusky lory
Birds of New Guinea
Yapen Islands
dusky lory
dusky lory
Taxonomy articles created by Polbot